Pelican Lake is a  lake located in Oneida County in Wisconsin. Visitors have access to the lake from five public boat landings. A dam is located on the lake's primary outlet, which feeds into the Pelican River. Pelican Lake serves as one of 21 reservoirs used to regulate and maintain optimal water flow on the Wisconsin and Tomahawk rivers, the process of which is facilitated in part by the Wisconsin Valley Improvement Company.

Fish inhabiting the lake include muskie, panfish, largemouth bass, smallmouth bass, northern pike and walleye. The lake's water clarity has historically been low, and its bottom composition is 40% sand, 20% gravel, 10% rock, 30% muck.  The lake is eutrophic. Several invasive species are or have been found in the lake, including banded mystery snail, Chinese mystery snail, curly-leaf pondweed, Eurasian water-milfoil, purple loosestrife, and rusty crayfish.

Pelican Lake was named for the American white pelicans seen there.  In the Ojibwe language, the lake goes by either Zhede-zaaga'igan (pelican lake) or more commonly as Gaa-wabaataawangaag-zaaga'igan (place where there is a sandy narrows lake).

References

External links
Pelican Lake at Lake-Link.com

Reservoirs in Wisconsin
Lakes of Oneida County, Wisconsin